Hugh Saunders (1894–1987) was an South African aviator and Royal Air Force officer .

Hugh Saunders may also refer to:

Hugh Saunders (academic) (died 1537), English clergyman and academic 
Hugh Saunders (speedway rider) (born 1944), English speedway rider